Tha Kham may refer to:

Tha Kham, Bangkok, a subdistrict (khwaeng) of Bang Khun Thian district
Tha Kham, Chiang Mai, a subdistrict municipality (thesaban tambon) of Hot district
Tha Kham, Chiang Rai, a subdistrict (tambon) of Wiang Kaen district
Tha Kham, Chumphon, a subdistrict (tambon) of Tha Sae district
Tha Kham, Surat Thani, a town municipality and subdistrict (tambon) of Phunphin district

See also
List of tambon in Thailand (T)